Rod Camphor (born March 10, 1992) is an American professional basketball player who last played for Karditsa of the Greek Basket League. He played college basketball at Highland Community College and at Southwestern Oklahoma State. He is a 1.91 m (6'3") tall shooting guard.

High school
Camphor attended Paul Laurence Dunbar High School, in Baltimore, Maryland, where he played high school basketball.

College career
Coming from Baltimore, Maryland, Camphor left his hometown after high school and went to Highland Community College. With the local university team, he went to the NJCAA, the league of two-year universities, at the start. In 2012, he moved to Southwestern Oklahoma State University at the NCAA Division II. During his senior year, Camphor averaged 17.7 points per game, being the best scorer of the team.

Professional career
After going undrafted in the 2014 NBA draft, Camphor joined Nevėžis of the Lithuanian League. On December 2015, Camphor signed with Bayer Giants Leverkusen. He went on to average 15.5 points, 3.9 rebounds and 3.3 assists per game. Leverkusen missed this season's relegation in the Bundesliga ProA.

The next season, he joined KTE-Duna Aszfalt in Hungary, but he left the team in order to return to Germany for Hamburg Towers.

On July 12, 2017, he joined Leuven Bears of the Pro Basketball League. He played nine games for his former team registered averages of 8.4 points and 3.8 assists per game. On November, he left the club and joined Turów Zgorzelec.

On June 11, 2018, he joined Kymis of the Greek League. On December 31, 2018, Camphor was amicably released from the Greek team, citing personal reasons.

Camphor spent the 2019–20 season in Poland with Rosa Radom, averaging 16.4 points, 3.1 rebounds and 4.4 assists per game. On July 27, 2020, he has signed with Krka of the Slovenian League. Camphor averaged 8.2 points, 1.8 assists and 1.7 rebounds per game. On October 7, 2021, he signed with US Monastir of the Championnat National A.

Later in the same month he went back to Poland and joined Astoria Bydgoszcz.

References

External links
RealGM.com profile
Eurobasket.com profile
Polish League profile 
Southwestern Oklahoma State Bulldogs bio

1992 births
Living people
American expatriate basketball people in Belgium
American expatriate basketball people in Germany
American expatriate basketball people in Greece
American expatriate basketball people in Hungary
American expatriate basketball people in Lithuania
American expatriate basketball people in Poland
American expatriate basketball people in Slovenia
American men's basketball players
ASK Karditsas B.C. players
Bayer Giants Leverkusen players
Basketball players from Baltimore
BC Nevėžis players
Hamburg Towers players
Highland Community College (Kansas) alumni
Junior college men's basketball players in the United States
Kecskeméti TE (basketball) players
KK Krka players
Kymis B.C. players
Leuven Bears players
Point guards
Rosa Radom players
Shooting guards
Southwestern Oklahoma State Bulldogs men's basketball players
Spójnia Stargard players
Turów Zgorzelec players
Astoria Bydgoszcz players